Michael or Mike Slattery may refer to:

 Michael Slattery (bishop) (1783–1857), Irish priest
 Michael Slattery (hurler), Irish hurler
 Michael Slattery (Gaelic footballer) (1866–1960), Irish Gaelic footballer
 Michael Slattery (admiral) (born 1954), Justice of the Supreme Court of New South Wales and Judge Advocate General of the Australian Defence Force
 Mike Slattery (baseball) (1866–1904), Major League Baseball player
 Mike Slattery (politician) (born 1981), Democratic member of the Kansas House of Representatives
 Mike Slattery, a character in the TV series The Last Ship